Anzor Kiknadze (26 March 1934 – 17 November 1977) was a Georgian judoka who won a bronze medal in the heavyweight division (+80 kg) at the 1964 Summer Olympics. At the world championships he won two bronze medals, in 1965 and 1967. At the European Championships he won an open title in 1962 and 1964–66, and finished second in 1967 and 1968. He was also European team champion in 1963–66, winning team bronzes in 1962 and 1967. Nationally, he was a Soviet champion in sambo in 1961–1965, but never competed in the judo championships, which were first held in 1973. After retiring from competitions he coached sambo and judo in Tbilisi where he died in a car accident, aged 43.

References

External links

 

1934 births
1977 deaths
Male judoka from Georgia (country)
Soviet male judoka
Judoka at the 1964 Summer Olympics
Olympic judoka of the Soviet Union
Olympic bronze medalists for the Soviet Union
Olympic medalists in judo
Road incident deaths in the Soviet Union
Medalists at the 1964 Summer Olympics